Kristina Hauer-Albertus (born 14 October 1945) is a German athlete. She competed in the women's long jump at the 1972 Summer Olympics.

References

External links
 

1945 births
Living people
People from Radebeul
German female long jumpers
Sportspeople from Saxony
Olympic athletes of East Germany
Athletes (track and field) at the 1972 Summer Olympics